The National Soccer League Under 21 Player of the Year was an annual soccer award present to the most outstanding player in Australia's National Soccer League under the age of 21. The award was established in the NSL's first season in 1977 and it ran until its last in 2003–04.

The inaugural winner was John Kosmina of West Adelaide, who finished fourth that season. The last winner of the award was Alex Brosque, who played for fourth-placed Marconi that season. Paul Trimboli, Paul Okon, Mark Viduka and Alex Brosque are the only players to win the award twice.

Winners

Multiple winners

Awards won by club

References 

National Soccer League (Australia)
Awards established in 1977
1977 establishments in Australia
Association football player of the year awards
Australian soccer trophies and awards